Legend of the White Dragon is an upcoming American science-fiction superhero film directed by Aaron Schoenke and was crowdfunded through Kickstarter scheduled for release in September 4, 2023. It stars Jason David Frank (in his final role after his death), Aaron Schoenke, Mayling Ng, David Ramsey, Andrew Bachelor, Jason Faunt, Ciara Hanna, Mark Dacascos, and Michael Madsen. The film is described as a "mature take on the Power Rangers franchise" and introduces a new universe.

Synopsis
Three years after Erik Reed was defeated in a colossal battle, the crystal he used to become the White Dragon was broken into two pieces. As a result, he was blamed for the collateral damage that ensued and his identity was outed, making him a fugitive and a hunted man. Erik partners with people from the past that have a history, and form a new team to reclaim his powers. Once reunited, he and his team are ready to battle a new villain that has recently emerged and is seeking revenge against the White Dragon. Erik and his new team must work together to stop the villain, hoping to clear his name and be reunited with his family.

Cast
 Jason David Frank as Erik Reed / White Dragon
 Aaron Schoenke as Jai Katua / Dragon Prime
 Mayling Ng as Tek Boh
 David Ramsey as Mayor Trevon Sterns
 Chalet Lizette Brannan as Jade
 Andrew Bachelor as URI
 Mark Dacascos as Xang
 Cerina Vincent as Rebecca Reed
 Michael Madsen as Max Reed
 Jason Faunt as Connor
 Rachelle Brooke Smith as Iris
 Ciara Hanna as Vanessa
 Kevin Porter as Lighthouse
 Jenna Rae Frank as Ashley Reed
 Johnny Yong Bosch

Background
The film was funded through two campaigns on Kickstarter with the first beginning on July 18, 2019 with the original concept starting out as a weekly web series, with s 5100,000 goal started for a web-series within 30 days. A concept teaser trailer was also released and uploaded on YouTube, but the goal wasn't met. The 3-minute trailer featured Power Rangers alums Frank, Hanna, Faunt, and Johnny Yong Bosch. Yoshi Sudarso, Chrysti Ane, and Jason's daughter Jenna Frank, were also attached, but never made an appearance in the concept teaser. The campaign concluded on August 11, 2019, without reaching its funding goal
The second campaign began on March 20 and lasted for 60 days, this time they shortened the budget to $100,000 but offered a new stretch goal of $500,000 for a feature film. The initial goal was met in 11 days, and the campaign ended on May 27, 2020 with $508,578 raised, meeting the goal for a feature film. Sudaso and Ane later dropped, but Jenna Frank stayed on board for the film. Filming began on the film a year later and lasted for 35 days.

Production
Production began in May 2020 in Los Angeles on the film. A week later, it was announced that Mayling Ng will play a new character

Trailer
The first trailer was released via YouTube on December 8, 2021.

Release 
The film is scheduled to be released in theaters on September 4, 2023.

References

External links